Graver is a surname. Notable people with the surname include:

Andy Graver (1927–2014), English footballer
Elizabeth Graver (born 1964), American writer
Fred Graver, American writer
Fred Graver (footballer)
Gary Graver (1938–2006), American film director
Kjersti Graver (1945–2009), Norwegian jurist

See also
Kesner-Graver